Ho Chi Minh City University of Technology and Education (Abbreviation: HCMUTE, Vietnamese: Trường Đại học Sư phạm Kỹ thuật Thành phố Hồ Chí Minh) is currently listed as one of the top 10 universities in Vietnam and also a member in the top group of Southeast Asia universities (basing on standard evaluation index).

This university offers bachelor's and associate degree to prospective lecturers in other technical institutions. The university also conducts technical research and vocational training, in addition to educational cooperation with foreign universities.

History
Ho Chi Minh City University of Technology and Education (HCMUTE) is the first university in Vietnam educating and training technical teachers for the whole country. Chronologically, HCMUTE has been renamed several times due to integration with other schools or its own promotion.

The university evolved from the Board of Technical Education, first founded on October 5, 1962, then renamed Nguyen Truong To Center for Technical Education in Thu Duc in September 1972, and later upgraded to Thu Duc College of Education in 1974. On October 27, 1976, the SRV Prime Minister issued a decision to establish Thu Duc University of Technical Education on the basis of Thu Duc College of Education. This was amalgamated with Thu Duc Industrial Vocational School in 1984 and further merged with Technical Teacher Training School No.5 in 1991 to become the present Ho Chi Minh City University of Technology and Education. In 1995, the university incorporated with National University Ho Chi Minh City as an informal member. In 2000, HCMUTE became a member under supervision of Ministry of Education and Training of Vietnam (MoET).

Milestones 
 October 5, 1962: Founded as Board of Technical Education founded with five disciplines
 1972: Renamed as Nguyen Truong To Center for Technical Education in Thu Duc
 1974: Upgraded to Thu Duc College of Education
 October 27, 1976: Promoted to Thu Duc University of Technical Education
 1984: Thu Duc Industrial Vocational School amalgamated with Thu Duc University of Technical Education
 1991: Technical Teacher Training School No. 5 amalgamated with Thu Duc University of Technical Education
 1992: First post graduate program started
 1995: Became non-official member of Vietnam National University Ho Chi Minh City
 2000: Separated from Vietnam National University Ho Chi Minh City
 November 2011: The Center Building inaugurated
 March 2012: 3 PhD programs started
 October 2014: Renamed as Ho Chi Minh City University of Technology and Education

Governmental Awards 
During its more than 50 years of development, HCMUTE has been granted many governmental awards for excellent performance, such as an Independence Decoration - Second Class (2012), Independence Decoration - Third Class (2007), a Labor Decoration -First Class (2001), a Labor Decoration -Second Class (1996), a Labor Decoration - Third Class (1985) by the SRV President, an Emulation Flag of the Government (2008), an Emulation Flag of the MoET (2009), Emulation Flag of Ho Chi Minh City People Committee (2012), many other Certificates of Merit and so on.

Infrastructure 

Computers: 1,100 for teaching, learning and research; 450 for management and administration.

HCMUTE also has a football field, three volleyball courts, a tennis court, a sporting event hall and two dormitories.

Accreditation 
Ho Chi Minh University of Technology and Education is proud to be one of the first ten accredited universities in Vietnam, one of the first few universities applying ISO 9001 management system.

ASEAN University Network – Quality Assurance 

HCMUTE has ASEAN University Network – Quality Assurance (AUN-QA) Standard Accreditation for four programs:

 Construction Engineering Technology
 Automotive Engineering Technology
 Mechatronics Engineering Technology
 Electrical and Electronics Engineering Technology
 Automation and Control Engineering Technology

Academics 
Ho Chi Minh City University of Technology and Education offers 29 Bachelor's Degrees, 13 Master's Degrees and 6 Doctorate Degrees in 15 faculties and Institutes.

Schools and departments

Faculties 
 School of Vehicle and Energy Engineering
 School of Mechanical Engineering
 School of Electrical and Electronic Engineering
 School of Chemical and Food Technology
 School of Civil Engineering and Applied Mechanics
 School of Foundation Sciences
 School of Garment Technology and Fashion Design
 School of Graphic Arts and Media
 School of High Quality Training
 School of Information Technology
 School of Economics
 School of Foreign Languages
 School of Political Sciences
 School of Innovation Entrepreneurship

Institutes and research centers 
 Institute of Technical Education
 Energy and Environment Lab
 Open Lab
 Young Scientist HCMUTE Lab

Gallery

References

External links
 Official website
 Official Fanpage
 Ho Chi Minh City University of Technology and Education (in Vietnamese)

Universities in Ho Chi Minh City